Rhinophis oxyrhynchus, also known as Schneider's earth snake or Schneider's shieldtail, is a species of uropeltid snake endemic to Sri Lanka.

Geographic range
It is found in Sri Lanka in the Northern and Eastern Provinces (Mullaitivu, Vavoniya, Trincomalee).

Type locality of Typhlops oxyrhyncus: "India orientali".

Type locality of Dapatnaya lankadivana: "Trincomalie, and [...] the Kandyan Province".

Type locality of Mytilia unimaculata: "Ceylon".

Description
Brown dorsally and ventrally, each scale with a lighter margin. Tail with some yellow markings.

Dorsal scales arranged in 17 or 19 rows at midbody (in 19 or 21 rows behind the head). Ventrals 217–227; subcaudals 5–7.

Snout acutely pointed. Rostral laterally compressed, keeled above, ½ as long as the shielded part of the head. Nasals separated by the rostral. Eye in the ocular shield. No supraoculars. Frontal not longer than broad. No temporals. No mental groove. Tail ending in a large convex rugose shield, which is neither truncated nor spinose at the end. Diameter of body 37 to 39 times in the total length. Ventrals only slightly larger than the contiguous scales. Caudal disc about as long as the shielded part of the head.

Notes

Further reading

 Beddome, R.H. 1886. An Account of the Earth-Snakes of the Peninsula of India and Ceylon. Ann. Mag. Nat. Hist. (5) 17: 3-33.
 Gray, J.E. 1858. On a New Genus and several New Species of Uropeltidæ, in the Collection of the British Museum. Proc. Zool. Soc. London, 1858: 260–265. (Mytilia unimaculata).
 Gray, J.E. 1858. On a New Genus and several New Species of Uropeltidæ, in the Collection of the British Museum. Ann. Mag. Nat. Hist. (3) 2: 376–381. (Mytilia unimaculata).
 Kelaart, E.F. 1853. Descriptions of new or little-known species of Reptiles collected in Ceylon. Ann. & Mag. Nat. Hist. Series 2, Volume 13, pp. 25–31. (Dapatnaya lankadivana).
 Schneider, J.G. 1801. Historiae Amphibiorum naturalis et literariae Fasciculus secundus continens Crocodilos, Scincos, Chamaesauras, Boas, Pseudoboas, Elapes, Angues, Amphisbaenas et Caecilias. Fromann. Jena. 374 pp. (Typhlops oxyrhynchus, pp. 341–342).

oxyrhynchus
Snakes of Asia
Reptiles of Sri Lanka
Endemic fauna of Sri Lanka
Reptiles described in 1801
Taxa named by Johann Gottlob Theaenus Schneider